Andreja Leskovšek (born 11 January 1965, in Kranj) is a Slovenian former alpine skier who competed for Yugoslavia in the 1984 Winter Olympics.

External links
 

1965 births
Living people
Slovenian female alpine skiers
Olympic alpine skiers of Yugoslavia
Alpine skiers at the 1984 Winter Olympics
Universiade medalists in alpine skiing
Sportspeople from Kranj
Universiade bronze medalists for Yugoslavia
Competitors at the 1987 Winter Universiade